Snuff is a novel by Chuck Palahniuk that was released on May 20, 2008.

Book description
Cassie Wright, pornography priestess, intends to cap her legendary career by breaking the world record for serial fornication on camera, with six hundred men. Snuff unfolds through the perspectives of Mr. 600, Mr. 72, Mr. 137, and Wright's personal assistant, Sheila. With his satirical narrative and thorough research, Chuck Palahniuk reveals through these four characters the little-known facts and histories of not only pornography and sexual deviance, but also acting and life in and out of the spotlight, and throughout the novel shows the rarely acknowledged presence of pornography in modern America.

First edition copies
The first edition print of the books included a light brown color to the font, and as usual with Palahniuk's releases, a heavily themed jacket and inside cover for the book. Inside and on the book liner were various sexual poses outlined in dark brown against a lighter brown.

Plot
Snuff follows three men who are waiting to immortalize themselves into pornography history as they wait to bed Cassie Wright, a former porn queen who has fallen into harder times. Each chapter follows a different guy (Mr. 600, Mr. 72, and Mr. 137), as well as Sheila, the female wrangler who dictates who is the next to be filmed with Cassie Wright. As the three men wait, each starts to divulge their true reasons for wanting to be filmed, as well as discuss the sordid history of Cassie Wright and her reason for suddenly dropping out of the pornography industry for a year. As backgrounds, secrets, and would-be children start to appear, the tensions in the room start to rise and in the end the true secrets of her comeback, and who really is Cassie Wright's porn child, are the last things any of them suspect.

Film
A film version was in production starring Tom Sizemore, to be written and directed by Golan Ramras and Fabien Martorell, and to be produced by Immortal Transmedia.  Although many other Palahniuk films have been put in production, this one has seen more light than the others. The film version of the novel would be the third book by Palahniuk to be made into a film after Fight Club and Choke.

At one point, it was reported that Daryl Hannah and Thora Birch were also attached to the project and later the claims were dismissed by Hannah and Birch, while Sizemore was reportedly still interested in the project.

Background
 The story was originally inspired by Annabel Chong, who set the record for engaging in 251 sex acts with around 70 men in 10 hours.
 The book release around Mother's Day is intentional, due to one of the subplots of the novel involving a mother-child relationship.

References

External links
 

2008 American novels
American erotic novels

Novels by Chuck Palahniuk
Doubleday (publisher) books
Novels about pornography
Books with cover art by Rodrigo Corral
Novels set in one day